Leninaul is a rural locality (a selo) and the administrative centre of Arslanbekovsky Selsoviet, Nogaysky District, Republic of Dagestan, Russia. The population was 540 as of 2010. There are 8 streets.

Geography 
Leninaul is located 15 km northeast of Terekli-Mekteb (the district's administrative centre) by road. Kalininaul and Terekli-Mekteb are the nearest rural localities.

Nationalities 
Nogais live there.

References 

Rural localities in Nogaysky District, Dagestan